A  (Chinese: chih-jih) is the directing monk in charge of every movement of the monks coming to sit zazen in the zendo in a Japanese Zen monastery of the Rinzai School. Their position is that of head monk, and they are generally regarded as strict disciplinarians. Their position is considered most desirable to hold in the meditation hall. The jikijitsu also ensures that the monks get to sleep and wake up on time according to a strict protocol.

History
Originally the name was given to the monk who was assigned to take care of the monastery's robes and bowls. The monks rotated this duty among themselves each day. Today a monk may be appointed to the position for the duration of a sesshin (possibly more than one consecutive day).

Timekeeper
The jikijitsu is the timekeeper for sessions of zazen, kinhin (walking meditation), and meals. Times during the daily schedule are signalled with wood blocks called han and with gongs, umpans and handbells.

Keisaku
During zazen, the jikijitsu will walk around the zendo wielding a keisaku (a "staff of admonition" or Zen stick, Chinese: ching ts'e), which is used to strike a student's back when they have lost focus. These strikes are generally not violent, and will often relieve muscle cramps for the individual being struck. They sound like a loud whack and can terrify newcomers, but they "are not particularly painful". In the Rinzai school, the jikijitsu may strike a student without a student's request if they feel the student has gone astray. In the Sōtō school, a student will ask for a blow by placing both palms together in gassho as the jikijitsu walks in front of them.

See also
Jikido
Jisha
Sanzen

Notes

References

Zen